The Lilongwe Wildlife Centre is a wildlife sanctuary in Lilongwe, Malawi. It was founded in 2007 by the Lilongwe Wildlife Trust (LWT), with support from the Born Free Foundation. The Centre is a member of the Pan African Sanctuary Alliance.

Aims
Lilongwe Wildlife Trust's mission is to "Protect Malawi’s wildlife by helping wild animals in need, combating wildlife crime and empowering the guardians of the wild." The organisation focuses on four areas of work: wildlife rescue and welfare, education and advocacy, wildlife law enforcement, and wildlife research.

Lilongwe Wildlife Center falls under the wildlife rescue and welfare branch of the organization's work, with the aim to participate in important conservation work in Malawi. The Wildlife Center provides sanctuary space for rescued, confiscated, orphaned and injured wild animals, meeting international animal welfare standards (e.g. PASA & GFAS). Wild animals that undergo rehabilitation at the Wildlife Center are released back into protected areas whenever possible under controlled and monitored conditions. Additionally, the Wildlife Center carries out work to promote wildlife conservation and welfare and to support statutory authorities.

Wildlife Rescue and Rehabilitation
Lilongwe Wildlife Centre was set up by LWT, with support from the Born Free Foundation, in 2007 as sanctuary for rehabilitating Malawi's injured, orphaned, and confiscated wildlife. The majority of intakes are handled on site. The Wildlife Centre is currently Malawi's only PASA accredited wildlife sanctuary and is responsible for caring for around 200 wild animals annually, including birds, reptiles, carnivores, primates and antelope species. The majority of the Wildlife Centre's intake are rescued as orphans and victims of the illegal pet and bushmeat trade, which is still prevalent in Malawi, or wildlife which has sustained injuries from poaching attempts and human wildlife conflicts. Many of their rehabilitated animals are released back into the wild or, if not, remain at the Wildlife Centre in large natural enclosures. Lilongwe Wildlife Centre is supported by leading animal welfare organisations such as Born Free Foundation, Stitching AAP, Tusk Trust, International Primate Society and International Primate Protection League.  In 2011, Lilongwe Wildlife Centre received a Responsible Tourism award for Best Organisation for Wildlife Conservation.

Additionally, LWT run a veterinary Wildlife Emergency Response Unit (WERU) which is available for cases around the country that require on-site attention. WERU is a joint initiative between the Malawi Government and LWT.

Wildlife Advocacy and Enforcement
LWT launched a campaign called 'Stop Wildlife Crime - Protect Malawi's Wildlife’ in 2014 in conjunction with the Malawi Government, calling for attitudinal and behavioural change, sensitising the general public, decision makers and law enforcement agencies. There other advocacy and enforcement work includes: lead partner in a toolkit assessment on the nature and status of illegal wildlife trade in Malawi completed on behalf of Government; partnering with the Government to review and strengthen the National Parks and Wildlife Act of Malawi (NPWA); local NGO representative on the steering committee of the Malawi National Elephant Action Plan; provision of civil society representation to the Inter-Agency Committee on Combating Wildlife Crime (IACCWC) in Malawi; and the principal supporter of proactive wildlife investigations in Malawi.

In 2018, LWT supported the Malawi Government in introducing the country's first wildlife detection dogs at Malawian airports.

LWT is Malawi's sole representative on the Species Survival Network and a founding civil society member of ICCF in Malawi.

Education and Community Outreach
LWT's Lilongwe Environmental Education Programme (LEEP) aims to frequently engage local students, covering topics including wildlife crime, human-wildlife conflict, wildlife welfare and biodiversity. The programme's sister programme, PEEP, similarly educates those living near Protected Areas, in partnership with local NGO's. LWT's community outreach programmes include adult literacy, bee keeping, afforestation, permaculture, tree planting and alternative fuels.

Wildlife Research
Lilongwe Wildlife Trust's research work covers wildlife welfare, wildlife management and conservation medicine, working both independently and with partners. Key projects include urban hyaena relocation, adaptation of primates released into the wild, and disease screening for captive wild animals.

References

External links
 

Nature conservation in Malawi
Environmental organisations based in Malawi
Wildlife sanctuaries of Africa
2007 establishments in Malawi
Buildings and structures in Lilongwe